Bergner is a surname. Notable people with the surname include:

 Audrey Bergner (born 1927), Israeli artist
 Christoph Bergner (born 1948), German politician
 Elisabeth Bergner (1897–1986), German actress
 Jeffrey Bergner, American political operative, lobbyist, and official
 Julie Bergner, American mathematician
 Ola Bergner (born 1972), Swedish flash animator
 Sasha Bergner (born 1974), Canadian curler
 Patrik Bergner (born 1962), Swedish actor, film director, and playwright
 Yosl Bergner (1920–2017), Israeli painter

See also 
 Bergner's, department store